The Ieper Group is a group of rock strata in the subsurface of northwest Belgium. The group is subdivided into three marine formations, all formed during the Ypresian, a single age of the geologic timescale (55.8 to 48.6 million years ago, the oldest age of the Eocene epoch). Both age and group are named after the West Flemish town of Ypres, for which the Dutch name is "Ieper".

History of definition

Ypresian 

In the original description of his newly introduced Ypresian stage Dumont (1850) did mention neither stratotype nor type locality. He simply referred to the "collines d'Ypres" or Ieper Hills, as the area where the unit is best developed. However, it remains unclear what is meant by this term. The town of Ieper is situated in western Belgium, at the southern end of a small, NW-SE oriented depression ( above mean sea level), surrounded from north to south by a series of low hills (between ). Dumont probably envisaged the elevated zones a few km north and east of Ieper (St.-Jan, Zillebeke, etc.), where clay beds have been quarried for brick and tile making for quite a long time.

The neostratotype is located on the right bank of the river Oise at St. Leu d'Esserent and the large quarry at St. Vaast-les-Mello (Oise).

Since 2003, the Global Stratotype Section and Point (GSSP) defined by the International Commission on Stratigraphy (ICS) for the Ypresian is set in the Dababiya section  close to Luxor, Egypt, where the uppermost Tarawan Limestone, the Esna Formation and the lowermost Thebes Limestone define the Ypresian sequence. Several other proposals for the lithostratigraphic redefinition of the top of the Ypresian exist; among others the Punta Torcida Formation of the Austral or Magallanes Basin in Tierra del Fuego, the Azkorri Sandstone in the Gorrondatxe section of the North Pyrenean Foreland or Basque–Cantabrian Basin, the Agost section close to Alicante in the Agost Basin in the Betic Cordillera, and the Fortuna section north of Murcia in the Prebetic realm of the Betic Cordillera, all in Spain. Other proposed type sections for the Ypresian-Lutetian boundary are located in France, Italy, Israel, Tunisia, Morocco, Cuba and Mexico.

Stratigraphy 
The Ieper Group was redefined by Steurbaut in 2006, and is since 2017 subdivided into five formations by the National Commission for the Stratigraphy of Belgium, from youngest to oldest:

Outcrops 
The Kortrijk Formation predominantly consists of marine clay. It occurs in the west and north of Belgium, the Tielt Formation, consisting of fine sand, is found in the subsurface of western and central Belgium and the Gentbrugge Formation, which comprises an alternation of clay, silt and fine sand, crops out in East and West Flanders.

The Ieper Group lies stratigraphically on top of the Landen Group (upper Paleocene) and below the Zenne Group (like the Ieper Group early Eocene in age). Unlike the Zenne Group, the Ieper Group can also occur in more southern parts of Belgium, for example in the Mons Basin.

Paleontology 
The Tielt Formation has provided fossils of mammals, birds and reptiles.

See also 
 List of fossiliferous stratigraphic units in Belgium
 Ypresian formations
 Fur Formation of Denmark
 London Clay Formation of England
 Silveirinha Formation of Portugal
 Wasatchian formations
 Nanjemoy Formation of the eastern United States
 Wasatch Formation of the western United States
 Itaboraian formations
 Itaboraí Formation of Brazil
 Laguna del Hunco Formation of Argentina

References

Bibliography 

 
 
 
 
 

Other Ypresian
 
 
 
 

Geologic groups of Europe
Geologic formations of Belgium
Lithostratigraphy of Belgium
Eocene Series of Europe
Paleogene Belgium
 
Formations
Formations
Formations
Formations
Formations
Formations